Dean Bryan Barton-Smith, AM (born 1 November 1967) is an Australian former decathlete who competed in the 1992 Summer Olympics. He also won medals at the Deaflympics in 1989, 1993 and 2005. Barton-Smith is most noted for his work and advocacy with the Australian Federation of Disability Organisations, Deaf Sports Australia and the Deaflympics. Smith also holds world record in Decathlon and also represented Australia at the Commonwealth Games in 1990 and 1994.

He is the former CEO of Deaf Children Australia. In 2013, Barton-Smith was appointed with the Order of Australia.

References

External links

1967 births
Living people
Australian decathletes
Olympic athletes of Australia
Athletes (track and field) at the 1992 Summer Olympics
Deaf competitors in athletics
Australian deaf people
Members of the Order of Australia